Beatriz Pla Navarro (born 24 December 1949) better known as Beatriz Carvajal is a Spanish theatre, television and film actress.

Career
She wanted to be an actress since she was a child and she took part in some theatre plays (La zapatera prodigiosa, Mariana Pineda, Los árboles mueren de pie or Cuidado con las personas formales) in the 1960s and 1970s.

Later on, her roles in Televisión Española made her a very popular actress and she has already participated in numerous television series, theatre plays and films.

She is single and has two adoptive daughters, Montse Pla, who worked with her in Compañeros, and Nisma.

Filmography

Television
625 Lineas (1978), by José Antonio Plaza, TVE.
Lápiz y papel (1981), TVE.
Un, dos, tres... responda otra vez (1982, 1983, 1985) as La Loli, TVE.
Querida Concha (1992), with Concha Velasco, Telecinco.
Lleno, por favor (1993), by Vicente Escrivá, Antena 3.
¿Quién da la vez? (1995), by Vicente Escrivá, Antena 3.
Carmen y familia (1995) by Óscar Ladoire, TVE.
Más que amigos (1998), as Loli, Telecinco.
Compañeros (1998–2002), as Marisa Viñé. Antena 3.
Paco y Veva (2004), TVE.
Aquí no hay quien viva (2006), as María Jesús, la Torrijas, Antena 3.
La que se avecina (2007–2010), as Goya, Telecinco.
Bienvenidos al Lolita (2014) as Dolores Reina.

Stage
Los habitantes de la casa deshabitada (1981).
I do,I do (1982).
Con ellos llegó la risa (1983).
El hotelito (1985), by Antonio Gala.
Lázaro en el laberinto (1985), by Antonio Buero Vallejo.
Entre tinieblas (1992), by Fermín Cabal.
Los bosques de Nyx (1994), Festival de Teatro Clásico de Mérida,

Film
Brujas (1995), by Álvaro Fernández Armero with Ana Álvarez and Penélope Cruz
Corazón loco (1997), by Antonio del Real
Sprint especial (2005), by Juan Carlos Claver
Ninette  (2005), by José Luis Garci

Shortfilms
El Síndrome Martins (1999), de Jaime Magdalena
Velocidad (2000), de Fernando González
Mi abuelo es un animal (2000), by Mariano Barroso 
Otro tiempo (2001), by Belén Santos

Awards and nominations

References

External links
 

1949 births
Living people
Spanish film actresses
Actresses from Madrid
20th-century Spanish actresses
21st-century Spanish actresses
Spanish television actresses
Spanish stage actresses